Ralf Kohl (born 28 October 1965 in Weinheim, Baden-Württemberg) is a German former professional footballer who played as a midfielder or defender.

References

External links
 

1965 births
Living people
People from Weinheim
Sportspeople from Karlsruhe (region)
Association football midfielders
German footballers
SC Freiburg players
Bundesliga players
2. Bundesliga players
Footballers from Baden-Württemberg
20th-century German people